ʿUthmān ibn ʿAlī was a son of Ali ibn Abi Talib and Umm al-Banin. He fought in the Battle of Karbala, in which he was martyred. Uthman is highly honored by Muslims for his sacrifice. According to some sources Uthman was 21 and had no children when he was martyred. 

Uthman and his brothers Abbas, Abdullah, and Ja'far accompanied Husayn ibn Ali in his journey from Mecca to Kufa and were martyred at the Battle of Karbala. Their graves are in the mausoleum of the collective grave of the martyrs of Karbala in the shrine of Husayn ibn Ali.

Biography 
He was son of Ali and Fatima bint Hizam. Apparently, 'Uthman did not get married and had no children. Ali named his son Uthman after Uthman ibn Maz'un according to shia narration.

Uthman's mother, Fatima, was the daughter of Hizam ibn Khalid ibn Rabi'a from the Arab tribe of Banu Kilab. She was the mother of three more sons of Ali, namely Abbas, Abdullah, and Ja'far, and for this reason she became known as Umm al-Banin.

Martyrdom 
Uthman went to the battlefield reciting the following Rajaz: “Verily I am Uthman the possessor of glory, my master is Ali the executor of virtuous deeds, this is Husayn the master of fairness, the master of the young and old”. Khawli ibn Yazid al-Asbahi shot an arrow at Uthman's forehead resulting in him falling off his horse. Then, a man from Banu Darim tribe beheaded him.

Uthman ibn Ali was 21 years old when he was martyred on the day of Ashura  His grave is in the mausoleum of the collective grave of the martyrs of Karbala in the shrine of Husayn.

References 

People killed at the Battle of Karbala

Husayn ibn Ali
Hussainiya
Year of birth unknown
680 deaths
Children of Rashidun caliphs
Children of Ali
Family of Muhammad